Wolves of the North is a 1921 American silent Western film directed by Norman Dawn and starring Herbert Heyes, Percy Challenger and Eva Novak.

Cast
Herbert Heyes as 'Wiki' Jack Horn
Percy Challenger as Professor Norris
Eva Novak as Aurora Norris
Starke Patteson as David Waters
Barbara Tennant as Jenfau Jen
Eagle Eye as Massakee 
Clyde Tracy as Lech
Millie Impolito as Rose of Spain

References

Bibliography

External links

1921 Western (genre) films
1920s English-language films
American silent feature films
Silent American Western (genre) films
Films directed by Norman Dawn
American black-and-white films
Universal Pictures films
1920s American films